In the Republic of Ireland, a Doctor of Governance (DGov) is a doctoral degree consisting of both intensive research and taught elements over a four-year period and is almost always related to corporate governance , regulation and compliance, policy making, supranational governance, globalisation or politics in general. Usually, those undertaking a DGov will have been working at a high-ranking level in the civil or public service for a number of years. Often the degree is offer in collaboration between universities in two or more jurisdictions on an international basis.

Example Coursework
 The Changing Role of the Nation State 
 Modernization: Government and Democracy
 The Internationalization of Legal Frameworks
 Citizenship and Legitimacy
 Economics and Governance
 Evaluation and Governance

References

Doctoral degrees